Al-Aybaki Mosque (also referred to as the Mosque of Sheikh Abdullah al-Aybaki, Arabic transliteration: 
Jami ash-Shaykh 'Abdallah al-Aybaki) is a historic mosque situated in the al-Tuffah neighborhood of Gaza City, Palestine. Built by the Mamluks in the late 13th century, the mosque is named after Sheikh Abdullah al-Aybaki, a Muslim religious leader. According to his nisba "Aybaki", Sheikh Abdullah was a mamluk or relative of Izz al-Din Aybak, the first Mamluk sultan of Egypt. Sheikh Abdullah's son Sheikh Iyad was buried nearby at the Sayed al-Hashim Mosque in al-Daraj while his other son Ahmad al-Aybaki, a local saintly person, was buried in a sanctuary called al-Mazar ash-Sheikh Aybak.

References

Further reading

13th-century mosques
Mamluk architecture in the State of Palestine
Mosques in Gaza City